John Gardner Murray (August 31, 1857 – October 3, 1929) was the sixteenth presiding bishop of the Episcopal Church. He was the first person elected to the position rather than succeeding to it automatically as the oldest bishop when his predecessor died.

Early and family life
Murray was born in Lonaconing, Allegany County. His parents were both born in Scotland. The public schools of Lonaconing provided his early education. He attended the Wyoming Seminary in Pennsylvania and Drew Theological Seminary in New Jersey.

Murray's education was interrupted by the death of his father. He worked in mining and manufacturing from 1879 to 1892 in Kansas, Colorado, New Mexico and Alabama. During these years, he kept active in serving his church. In 1881, he married Harriet M. Sprague. They married in Kansas and took up residence in Alabama. Their daughter Emeline was born there. In 1884, Mrs. Murray and Emeline drowned when the steamer Belmont capsized on the Ohio River during a cyclone. Five years later, Murray married Clara A. Hunsicker, of the same town in Kansas. Six children were born to this marriage.

Ministry
From 1893 onward, Murray devoted his career to church ministry. By April 1894, he was ordained a priest of the Episcopal Church in Selma, Alabama. He ministered in Alabama until 1903 when he moved to Baltimore, Maryland. In 1911, a convention of the Diocese of Maryland elected Rev. Murray to succeed Bishop William Paret.

Bishop Murray became the first elected Presiding Bishop of the Episcopal Church, serving from January 1, 1926 until his death on October 3, 1929.  Bishop Murray was the 16th Presiding Bishop.  Previous bishops had been assigned by convention by geographic rotation (1st through 3rd) or by seniority as a bishop (4th through 15th).

Death and legacy
He died in office in New York City in 1929, and is buried in Druid Ridge Cemetery in Pikesville, Baltimore County, Maryland.

See also
 List of presiding bishops of the Episcopal Church in the United States of America
 List of Episcopal bishops of the United States
 Historical list of the Episcopal bishops of the United States
Frederick, Maryland

References

External links

Presiding Bishops of the Episcopal Church in the United States of America
Wyoming Seminary alumni
Drew University alumni
1929 deaths
1857 births
People from Lonaconing, Maryland
American people of Scottish descent
Converts to Anglicanism from Methodism
Episcopal bishops of Maryland